is a Japanese actress, YouTuber, and model under Ken-On. She is known for playing lead roles in Ouran High School Host Club, POV: Norowareta Film, Zekkyō Gakkyū, and Say "I love you".

Career 
In 2007 Kawaguchi won the Grand Prix at the 11th Nicola audition. After joining the child division of Ken-On, she made her debut in the October 2007 issue of Nicola released on September 1 of that year.

From October 4, 2008, to March 28, 2008, she became a regular in the girls' corner on the variety show Fightension☆TV, her first television show. She also performed in the music group merry merry boo in March 2009 when she covered "Ima Sugu Kiss Me", originally by LINDBERG, as part of Fightension☆TV.

In spring 2009, Kawaguchi was selected as the 13th Rehouse Girl of Mitsui's Rehouse. On March 1, she moved from the children's division of Ken-On to Ken-On. Her diary "Haru na Hiyori" on the Ken-On mobile phone website. Her official website was launched in late March. On July 9, 2009, she made her first appearance in a music video with Shunsuke Nakamura for Hi-Fi Camp "Dakara Ippo Mae e Fumidashite" which was used as the commercial song for Pocari Sweat "Unmei no Natsu-hen (Summer Edition of Fate)". In early August, she toured 12 cities across Japan at the event "Pocari Sweat o Nonde Kawaguchi Haruna・Hi-Fi Camp ni Aou! (Let's drink Pocari Sweat and Meet Haruna Kawaguchi and Hi-Fi Camp!)". In October 2009, she made her debut as an actress in the Fuji TV drama Tokyo Dogs.

On March 13, 2010, she had her first lead role in the P&G Pantene drama special Hatsukoi Chronicle. On June 7, 2010, she became the second support girl for Senkou Riot and served as a support girl at "Senkou Riot 2010" held on August 1, 2010. From July 30 to September 2010, she appeared in au LISMO's commercials for LISMO Fes! This commercial was selected for the 2010 CM Grand Prize in the magazine CM NOW. On November 2, she was selected as "Face of the Year" by Nikkei Trendy.

In 2011 she graduated from Nicola and stated that "from now on, I will focus on acting." She has been active as a model since then and has been featured on the covers of magazines like JJ and VOCE; she has also worked on fashion features. In July 2011, she starred in a serial drama for the first time with Ouran High School Host Club which was broadcast in the TSB drama slot "Friday Break". In November 2011, she became the seventh support manager (image girl) for the 90th National High School Soccer Championship.

On March 17, 2012, she starred in the movie Ouran High School Host Club. She released her first photo book "haruna" on March 20, which was shot on Ishigaki Island, her hometown of Goto Islands, and Fukue Island. In 2012 she placed first in MyNavi's "(Men's Edition) Who will be next year's star? Ranking of rookie actresses who will have their big break soon".

On March 24, 2013, she released her second photobook haruna2.

In October 2013, she starred in TBS's Thursday drama Otto no Kanojo (Husband's Girlfriend). It was her first starring role in a prime-time soap opera.

In 2013, she starred in the movie adaptation of "Real Escape Game" which was also made into a drama Madam Marmalade no Ijō na Nazo. It was released as a mystery solving movie with audience participation called "Nazoto Kinema" which was divided into "questions" (October 25) and "answers" (November 22). 

In October 2014, she starred in her first tage performance at Aoyama Amphitheater "Ikiterumono wa Inainoka".

On February 10, 2015, she released her third photobook haruna3.

In 2020, she played Kicho (Nohime) in the NHK Taiga drama "Kirin ga Kuru" due to the previous actress, Erika Sawajiri, dropping out due to being arrest on suspicion of violating the Narcotics Control Law before the start of broadcasting. This was her first period drama and her first appearance in a Taiga drama. Filming began on December 3 and the broadcast started on January 19, 2020, two weeks behind the originally scheduled January 5, 2020.

On January 31, 2020, she opened her official YouTube channel "Haachannel". The number of channel subscribers exceeded 700 thousand in the first month after opening. She continues to update by posting new videos almost every Sunday. She was adopted as a regular model for the magazine GINGER starting from the May 2020 issue.

On December 31, 2021, she was one of the hosts for the 72nd NHK Kōhaku Uta Gassen with Yo Oizumi and Mayuko Wakuda. Up until the previous year, hosts had been divided into red, white, and neutral, but they were unified as neutral. 

In February 2022, she won the Élan d'or Award for Newcomer of the Year, presented to the most promising new actor through the year. 

In the first half of 2022, she appeared as the heroine's older sister Ryoko in the NHK serial TV novel Chimudondon, marking her first appearance in a morning drama. In the second half of 2022, the NHK serial TV novel "Maiagare!", which is set in the Goto Islands, her hometown, aired, so she narrated in a related program.

Personal life 
Kawaguchi was born on Fukue Island, Goto Islands, Nagasaki Prefecture. From the first to third year of junior high school, when going to work, there was no direct flight to Tokyo, so she traveled to and from Hakata by boat for nine hours. At first this was only once a month, but it gradually increased to once a week.

She is the youngest of three sisters and describes herself as a "genuinely selfish, spoiled, and lonely girl". Her father passed away when Kawaguchi was 19, and in her Father's Day 2018 Instagram post, she shared a photo of herself saying she "looks too much like her father".

Her name "Haruna" comes from a letter of her grandfather's name, "Haru (Spring)". The "Na" was actually given by her older sister; it was originally supposed to be "Haruna (春菜)" but her mother thought it was "Haruna (春奈)" and delivered it as so to the city hall.

Her hobbies include sea fishing, and she has caught up to 300 fish. Her favorite female artists are Miliyah Kato, Ringo Sheena, and Namie Amuro. Her favorite male artist is EXILE. The entertainer she respects is Miho Kanno, who is also a senior at her company. She is also good friends with Riisa Naka, her costar in Yankee-kun to Megane-chan, who is also from Nagasaki Prefecture.

She said that before she became a Nicola model, she wanted to become a nursery teacher because she likes children. In a 2016 interview, she said that her dream was to become the heroine of a morning drama.

When she appeared in Aitsu Ima Nanishiteru?, according to her classmates from elementary school, Kawaguchi was more funny than cute at the time; she imitated Takayuki Haranishi of FUJIWARA so she was never popular.

Filmography

Film

Television

Mobile Drama
 Koiiro Waltz (2010) as Aki

Others
72nd NHK Kōhaku Uta Gassen (2021, NHK), host

Bibliography

Magazines
 Nicola, Shinchosha 1997-, as an exclusive model from 2007 to 2011

Photobooks
 haruna (20 March 2012, Wani Books) 
 haruna2 (24 March 2013, Wani Books) 
 Sonomanma Haruna (31 March 2014, Tokyo News Service) 
 haruna3 (10 February 2015, Wani Books)

Accolades

References

External links
  
 

1995 births
Living people
Actors from Nagasaki Prefecture
Japanese child actresses
Japanese film actresses
Japanese television actresses
Japanese female models
Ken-On artists
21st-century Japanese actresses
Models from Nagasaki Prefecture
Horikoshi High School alumni